Gerwasia is a genus of rust fungi in the family Phragmidiaceae. Species in the genus grow on Rubus and Rosa plants.

Species
Gerwasia clara
Gerwasia columbiensis
Gerwasia cundinamarcensis
Gerwasia epiphylla
Gerwasia holwayi
Gerwasia imperialis
Gerwasia jeffersii
Gerwasia lagerheimii
Gerwasia mayorii
Gerwasia peruviana
Gerwasia pittieriana
Gerwasia quitensis
Gerwasia rosae
Gerwasia rubi
Gerwasia rubi-urticifolii
Gerwasia standleyi
Gerwasia tayronensis
Gerwasia variabilis

References

External links

Pucciniales
Basidiomycota genera